Besri (also Romanized as Beşrī and Başarī; also known as Başran, Başrān, and Basren) is a village in Shirvan Rural District, in the Central District of Borujerd County, Lorestan Province, Iran. In the 2006 census, its population was 1,092, in 252 families.

References 

Towns and villages in Borujerd County